Monty Horan (19 March 1922 – 3 August 2005) was  a former Australian rules footballer who played with Fitzroy in the Victorian Football League (VFL).

Notes

External links 		
		
		
		
		
		
		
		
1922 births		
2005 deaths		
Australian rules footballers from Victoria (Australia)		
Fitzroy Football Club players
New Norfolk Football Club players